Lake Manitou is a man-made lake in Rochester, Indiana, created in 1827 by the federal government of the United States for the Potowatomi Native American tribe. The lake was created as a part of the treaty with the Potowatomi that required the U.S. government to create a mill for Potowatomi use. The Potowatomi originally called the lake Man-I-Toe which translated to the Devil's Lake due to the belief that a monster lived in the lake.

References

External links 
 Early Manitou Views
 http://www.lakemanitou.org/

Bodies of water of Fulton County, Indiana
Manitou
Tourist attractions in Fulton County, Indiana